Rhytiphora sannio is a species of beetle in the family Cerambycidae. It was described by Newman in 1838. It is known from Australia.

References

sannio
Beetles described in 1838